Hottentotta conspersus, the Sesriem Scorpion, is a species of scorpion of the family Buthidae.

Description
Body is sparsely hirsute, with granulated mesosoma and carapace and with seventh metasomal segment. Telson is granulated and very bulbous. Chelae are very narrow. Color varies from yellow to yellowish brown. Carapace and carinae may be black. Chelicerae are yellow without reticulation.

Distribution
This species occurs in Angola and Namibia.

References

Thorell, 1876 : Études scorpiologiques. Atti della Societá Italiana di Scienze Naturali, vol. 19, p. 75–272.

Buthidae
Invertebrates of Angola
Invertebrates of Namibia
Scorpions described in 1876